is Professor Emeritus in the Graduate School of Humanities and Social Sciences at the University of Tsukuba and Director of the Institute of Peace Linguistics. He is also Professor in the Department of English at Matsuyama University.

Education and career
Tsuda was born in Kanagawa, Japan in 1950. He majored in English and graduated from Yokohama National University in 1973. He received his M.A. in TEFL (Teaching English as a Foreign Language) in 1978 and his Ph.D. in Speech Communication in 1985 from Southern Illinois University at Carbondale.

Tsuda held several faculty positions in his academic career. He was associate professor in the Faculty of Economics at Nagasaki University from 1986 to 1988. He then moved to Nagoya University where he was associate professor in the Institute of Languages and Cultures from 1988 to 1993 and Professor in the Department of International Communication and in the Graduate School of International Development from 1993 to 2001.

Tsuda had been Professor in the Doctoral Program in Modern Cultures and Public Policies in the Graduate School of Humanities and Social Sciences at the University of Tsukuba since 2001. He retired from the University of Tsukuba and founded the Institute of Peace Linguistics in Ibaraki Prefecture in 2014. He is currently Professor in the Department of English at Matsuyama University in Ehime Prefecture.

Tsuda was Visiting Professor at the International Research Center for Japanese Studies in Kyoto in 1996  and at the College of San Mateo in California in 2007. He was also Braj Kachru Fellow in the "Internationalization Forum" program in 1996 and Visiting Fellow in 1999 at the East-West Center in Honolulu, Hawaii.

Tsuda's academic interests include language policy, cross-cultural psychoanalysis, and international and intercultural communication. Among his publications are Language Inequality and Distortion in Intercultural Communication: A Critical Theory Approach (John Benjamins, 1986), Language, Education, and Intercultural Communication (Nagasaki University, 1988), Eigo Shihai-no Kouzou [The Structure of the Dominance of English] (Daisan Shokan, 1990), Shinryaku-suru Eigo, Hangeki-suru Nihongo [The Invading English, The Counter-Attacking Japanese] (PHP Institute, 1996), and Eigo Shihai-to Kotoba-no Byoudou [The Hegemony of English and Linguistic Equality] (Keio University Press, 2006).

The Ecology of Language Paradigm
Tsuda is well known as a critic of the hegemony of English and as an advocate of linguistic and cultural pluralism. He believes that the domination of English is tantamount to linguicism and linguicide, and that addressing the problem of linguistic hegemony is crucial to the development of human and cultural security. In an article in The San Matean, a San Mateo Community College newspaper, dated March 19, 2007, Tsuda was quoted to say: "It is more important to be students learning other languages than being a teacher only teaching one." He proposed the "ecology of language" paradigm as opposed to the "diffusion of English" paradigm.

Tsuda urges international and intercultural communication scholars to recognize the hegemony of English as a subject of academic inquiry in the fields especially in the English-speaking countries. He also suggests that English-language teaching professionals incorporate the ecology of language paradigm into the contents and methods of teaching as well as teacher education. Finally, he insists that both native speakers and non-native speakers of English learn the philosophy of the ecology of language so that they will become more sensitive to the ethical aspects of international and intercultural communication.

Publications 
 Tsuda, Y. (1992). The dominance of English and linguistic discrimination. Media Development, 34(1), 32–34.
 Tsuda, Y. (1993). Communication in English: Is it anti-cultural? Journal of Development Communication, 4(1), 69–78.
 Tsuda, Y. (1994). The diffusion of English: Its impact on culture and communication. Keio Communication Review, 16, 49–61.
 Tsuda, Y. (1997). Hegemony of English vs. Ecology of Language: Building equality in international communication. In L. E. Smith & M. L. Forman (Eds.), World Englishes 2000: Selected essays (pp. 21–31). Honolulu, HI: College of Language, Linguistics and Literature, University of Hawaii and the East-West Center.    
 Tsuda, Y. (1998). Critical studies on the dominance of English and the implications for international communication. Japan Review, 10, 219–236.
 Tsuda, Y. (2000). Envisioning a democratic linguistic order. TESL Reporter, 33(1), 32–38.
 Tsuda, Y. (2000). The maintenance of the Korean language and identity in Japan. Studies in the Linguistic Sciences, 30(1), 219–227.
 Tsuda, Y. (2001). "World Englishes" as critical theory or ideology? Keio Communication Review, 23, 3-19.
 Tsuda, Y. (2002). The hegemony of English: Problems, opposing views, and communication rights. In G. Mazzaferro (Ed.), The English language and power (pp. 19–31). Alessandria, Italy: Edizionoi dell’Orso.          
 Tsuda, Y. (2008). English hegemony and English divide. China Media Research, 4(1), 47–55.     
 Tsuda, Y. (2010). Speaking against the hegemony of English: Problems, ideologies, and solutions. In T. K. Nakayama & R. T. Halualani (Eds.), The handbook of critical intercultural communication (pp. 248–269). West Sussex, UK: Wiley-Blackwell.
 Tsuda, Y. (2014). The hegemony of English and strategies for linguistic pluralism: Proposing the Ecology of Language Paradigm. In M. K. Asante, Y. Miike, & J. Yin (Eds.), The global intercultural communication reader (2nd ed., pp. 445–456). New York, NY: Routledge.

See also
 Critical applied linguistics
 Ecolinguistics
 English as a second or foreign language 
 International English
 Language death
 Linguistic discrimination
 Language planning
 Language policy
 Linguistic imperialism
 Language rights
 Multilingualism

References

External links
Institute of Peace Linguistics 
 The Hegemony of English and Strategies for Linguistic Pluralism: Proposing the Ecology of Language Paradigm 
 Envisioning a Democratic Linguistic Order
 A Critique of English as a Common Language for APEC: Three Perspectives
English as an International Language: Convenience or Equality?
Critical Studies on the Dominance of English and the Implications for International Communication
Democratization of Language Choice in Intercultural Communication
Language Discrimination and the Right to Language in Intercultural Communication
 The Maintenance of the Korean Language and Identity in Japan

1950 births
Living people
Academic staff of the University of Tsukuba
Academic staff of Matsuyama University
Communication theorists
Linguists from Japan
Linguistic rights